Brice M. Henry served as a member of the 1860-61 California State Assembly, representing the 2nd District.

References

Members of the California State Assembly
Year of birth missing
Year of death missing